Jeongdok Public Library is a library in Seoul, South Korea. It is located in Hwa-dong, Jongno-gu, on Bukchon-ro.

On the campus of Jeongdok Public Library was Jongchinbu, Seoul Tangible Cultural Property number 9. Jongchinbu was constructed in 1433 and is one of three remaining Joseon Dynasty government buildings. The rest were destroyed in the Japanese invasions, occupation, or the Korean War.

Until February 1976, the site was occupied by the campus of Kyunggi High School. The Jeongdok Library opened in January 1977 on the former site of the school.

Public transportation
The library is located within 500m of Anguk Station.

References

External links
 Official site (Korean)
 Photos and history
 Photos

Jongno District
Libraries in Seoul